In game theory, fictitious play is  a learning rule first introduced by George W. Brown.  In it, each player presumes that the opponents are playing stationary (possibly mixed) strategies. At each round, each player thus best responds to the empirical frequency of play of their opponent. Such a method is of course adequate if the opponent indeed uses a stationary strategy, while it is flawed if the opponent's strategy is non-stationary. The opponent's strategy may for example be conditioned on the fictitious player's last move.

History 
Brown first introduced fictitious play as an explanation for Nash equilibrium play.  He imagined that a player would "simulate" play of the game in their mind and update their future play based on this simulation; hence the name fictitious play.  In terms of current use, the name is a bit of a misnomer, since each play of the game actually occurs.  The play is not exactly fictitious.

Convergence properties 
In fictitious play, strict Nash equilibria are absorbing states.  That is, if at any time period all the players play a Nash equilibrium, then they will do so for all subsequent rounds.  (Fudenberg and Levine 1998, Proposition 2.1)  In addition, if fictitious play converges to any distribution, those probabilities correspond to a Nash equilibrium of the underlying game. (Proposition 2.2)

Therefore, the interesting question is, under what circumstances does fictitious play converge?  The process will converge for a 2-person game if:
 Both players have only a finite number of strategies and the game is zero sum (Robinson 1951) 
 The game is solvable by iterated elimination of strictly dominated strategies (Nachbar 1990)
 The game is a potential game (Monderer and  Shapley 1996-a,1996-b)
 The game has generic payoffs and is 2 × N (Berger 2005)

Fictitious play does not always converge, however.  Shapley (1964) proved that in the game pictured here (a nonzero-sum version of Rock, Paper, Scissors), if the players start by choosing (a, B), the play will cycle indefinitely.

Terminology
Berger (2007) states that "what modern game theorists describe as 'fictitious play' is not the learning process that George W. Brown defined in his 1951 paper": Brown's "original version differs in a subtle detail..." in  that modern usage involves the players updating their beliefs simultaneously, whereas Brown described the players updating alternatingly.   Berger then uses Brown's original form to present a simple and intuitive proof of convergence in the case of two-player nondegenerate ordinal potential games.

The term "fictitious" had earlier been given another meaning in game theory. Von Neumann and Morgenstern [1944] defined a "fictitious player" as a player with only one strategy, added to an n-player game to turn it into a (n + 1)-player zero-sum game.

References 
Berger, U. (2005) "Fictitious Play in 2xN Games", Journal of Economic Theory 120, 139–154.
Berger, U. (2007) "Brown's original fictitious play", Journal of Economic Theory 135:572–578
Brown, G.W. (1951) "Iterative Solutions of Games by Fictitious Play" In Activity Analysis of Production and Allocation, T. C. Koopmans (Ed.),  New York: Wiley.
 Fudenberg, D. and D.K. Levine (1998) The Theory of Learning in Games Cambridge: MIT Press.
 Monderer, D., and Shapley, L.S. (1996-a) "Potential Games", Games and Economic Behavior 14, 124-143.
 Monderer, D., and Shapley, L.S. (1996-b) "Fictitious Play Property for Games with Identical Interests", Journal of Economic Theory 68, 258–265.
 Nachbar, J. (1990) "Evolutionary Selection Dynamics in Games: Convergence and Limit Properties", International Journal of Game Theory 19, 59–89.
 von Neumann and Morgenstern (1944), Theory of Games and Economic Behavior, Princeton and Woodstock: Princeton University Press. 
 Robinson, J. (1951) "An Iterative Method of Solving a Game", Annals of Mathematics 54, 296–301.
 Shapley L. (1964) "Some Topics in Two-Person Games" In Advances in Game Theory M. Dresher, L.S. Shapley, and A.W. Tucker (Eds.), Princeton: Princeton University Press.

External links 
Game-Theoretic Solution to Poker Using Fictitious Play

Game theory